Phymata is a genus of assassin bugs belonging to the family Reduviidae, subfamily Phymatinae, commonly called jagged ambush bugs. They can be a variety of colors, with their coloring helping them camouflage with the plants they live on. They are predators.

Species
Species within this genus include:

References

Reduviidae
Cimicomorpha genera
Hemiptera of Europe
Hemiptera of North America
Taxa named by Pierre André Latreille